James M. Gustafson (December 3, 1925 – January 15, 2021) was an American theological ethicist. He received an honorary doctorate by the Faculty of Theology at Uppsala University in 1985. He has held teaching posts at Yale Divinity School and the Department of Religious Studies (1955–1972), the University of Chicago as professor of theological ethics in the Divinity School (1972–1988), and Emory University as the Henry R. Luce Professor of Humanities and Comparative Studies.  He retired in 1998 after 43 years of teaching and research, after being Woodruff Professor of Comparative Studies and of Religion in the Emory College and Graduate School of Arts & Sciences. He received the Lifetime Achievement Award for "creative and lasting contributions to the field of Christian ethics" on January 7, 2011, at the annual meeting of the Society of Christian Ethics in New Orleans.

Some of his prominent students include Stanley Hauerwas, William Schweiker, and Lisa Sowle Cahill.

Bibliography
 Christ and the Moral Life (1968) Harper and Row.
 On being responsible: Issues in personal ethics (1968) (Edited by) Harper Forum Books.
 Can Ethics Be Christian? (1975) University of Chicago Press.
 Protestant and Roman Catholic Ethics: Prospects for Rapprochement (1978) University of Chicago Press.
 Ethics from a Theocentric perspective, volume 1 "Theology and ethics" (1981) University of Chicago Press.
 Ethics from a Theocentric perspective, volume 2 "Ethics and Theology" (1992) University of Chicago Press.
 An Examined Faith: The Grace of Self-Doubt (2004) Augsburg Fortress.
 Moral Discernment in the Christian Life: Essays in Theological Ethics (2007), part of the Library of Theological Ethics collection. Westminster John Knox Press.

References

External links

James M. Gustafson papers, 1948-2004 at Pitts Theology Library, Candler School of Theology
“James M. Gustafson’s Framework for Theocentric Ethics.” Irish Theological Quarterly, vol. 56, no. 2, June 1990, pp. 114–123.

1925 births
2021 deaths
Christian ethicists
20th-century Protestant theologians
American Christian theologians
Yale University faculty
Yale Divinity School faculty
University of Chicago faculty
Emory University faculty
People from Norway, Michigan